José Alberto Mendoza Posas (born 21 July 1989 in Olanchito, Yoro), known as José Mendoza, is a Honduran footballer who play as goalkeeper for C.D. Olimpia.

Club career
Mendoza started his career at Platense and joined Marathón in summer 2012.

International career 
Mendoza was called up by Emilio Umanzor to the Honduras U20 for the 2009 FIFA U-20 World Cup. On 30 December 2010, Mendoza was included by Juan de Dios Castillo in Honduras's 23-man squad for the 2011 Copa Centroamericana and he played at the 2012 Summer Olympics.

Mendoza made his senior debut for Honduras in an October 2012 FIFA World Cup qualification match against Canada, his only cap as of February 2013.

Honours

Honduras
Copa Centroamericana (1): 2011

References

External links

“Queríamos ganarle a Brasil”: José Mendoza at CDMarathon.com 

José Mendoza at Footballdatabase

1989 births
Living people
People from Yoro Department
Association football goalkeepers
Honduran footballers
Honduras international footballers
Olympic footballers of Honduras
Footballers at the 2012 Summer Olympics
Platense F.C. players
C.D. Marathón players
Juticalpa F.C. players
Estudiantes de Mérida players
C.D.S. Vida players
Parrillas One players
Lobos UPNFM players
Liga Nacional de Fútbol Profesional de Honduras players
Liga Nacional de Fútbol de Guatemala players
2011 Copa Centroamericana players
2013 Copa Centroamericana players
2013 CONCACAF Gold Cup players
Copa Centroamericana-winning players